Toshihito is a masculine Japanese given name.

Possible writings
Toshihito can be written using different combinations of kanji characters. Some examples:

敏仁, "agile, humanity"
敏人, "agile, person"
俊仁, "talented, humanity"
俊人, "talented, person"
利仁, "benefit, humanity"
利人, "benefit, person"
年仁, "year, humanity"
年人, "year, person"
寿仁, "long life, humanity"
寿人, "long life, person"

The name can also be written in hiragana としひと or katakana トシヒト.

Notable people with the name
Toshihito Abe (阿部 俊人, born 1988), Japanese baseball player.
Toshihito Fujiwara (藤原 利仁, unknown birth and death dates), Japanese general.
Prince Hachijō Toshihito (八条宮 智仁親王, 1579–1629), Japanese prince.
Toshihito Ishimaru (石丸 利人, born 1931), Japanese boxer.
Toshihito Ito (伊藤 俊人, 1962–2002), Japanese actor.

Japanese masculine given names